ESTCube-2 is a three-unit (1 U standard dimension 100x100x113.5 mm) CubeSat built by the Estonian Student Satellite Foundation. This is the second satellite in the ESTCube program (the first was ESTCube-1). The satellite will be completed in the first half of 2022 and is scheduled to be launched in the end of 2022 from Kourou, French Guiana, with the European Space Agency's Vega-C launch vehicle.

The development of the satellite started in January 2014, but the necessary team and funding were not obtained until 2016. ESTCube-2, like ESTCube-1, is an educational-scientific project that aims to give university and high school students the opportunity to participate in the creation and completion of a space mission. Dozens of diploma theses are involved in the construction and development of the satellite.

The planned altitude of the ESTCube-2 orbit is 564 kilometers from the ground and the speed of the satellite in orbit is about 7.6 km/s.

Partners are the University of Tartu, Tartu Observatory, Finnish Meteorological Institute, GomSpace, Milrem Robotics, Foresail, Dresden University of Technology, Captain Corrosion, European Space Agency, European Commission

Satellite orbit 
The launch of ESTCube-2 is scheduled for the end of 2022 aboard the brand new Vega-C rocket from the European  Spaceport in Kourou, French Guiana. From this launch vehicle, the ESTCube-2 satellite will be launched at an altitude of 564 km in Sun synchronous orbit. Covering 7.6 kilometers in one second, ESTCube-2 makes almost 15 orbits (approximately 97 minutes per round) in one day.

Scientific purpose 

The primary goal of the ESTCube-2 project is to provide practical training in the development of space technology for undergraduate and high school students. This means that satellite design, prototyping, flight model assembly, testing and operating the satellite are the responsibility of students.

However, ESTCube-2 is more special than traditional university CubeSat missions because it is testing innovative technologies and solutions in space. The main purpose of the ESTCube-2 satellite's mission is to test the plasma brake, which will reduce the satellite's orbit and burn it up in the Earth’s atmosphere at the end of the satellite’s mission. The inventor of the plasma brake is Pekka Janhunen, a researcher at the Finnish Meteorological Institute. If the experiment is successful, then this technology will help combat an increasingly pressing problem in near-Earth orbit - space debris, i.e. the accumulation of dead satellites and their parts in orbit. Removing non-functional satellites from orbit would reduce the likelihood of a collision between a functioning satellite and unusable space debris.

A total of four innovative technologies are being tested on board the ESTCube-2:

 Testing of plasma brake technology in the Earth's ionosphere to remove the satellite from orbit at the end of its mission.
 Advanced testing of integrated satellite on-board systems and bus. This includes, in addition to conventional systems, a miniature star tracker, flywheels, a cold gas thrust module, and a radio experiment to determine the satellite's position.
 Testing of two Earth observation cameras developed at Tartu Observatory. The cameras operate at two different wavelengths and are designed to measure the NDVI vegetation index on Earth.
 The satellite is testing thin film anti-corrosion materials that are developed by Captain Corrosion (Maido Merisalu, a researcher at the University of Tartu).

Financing 
The total estimated cost of ESTCube-2 is €250,000. The satellite will be launched in the framework of the European Commission's In-Orbit demonstration / Validation program.

ESTCube-2 is funded by donors and the Tartu Observatory of the University of Tartu. Entrepreneur Ahti Heinla supported the launch of the ESTCube-2 project with a significant contribution. More than 400 supporters donated €38,753 for the development of ESTCube-2 as part of a campaign run on the co-funding platform Hooandja.

See also

 ESTCube-1

References

External links

 Article about ESTCube-2 in Space Travel Blog

2019 in Estonia
CubeSats
Science and technology in Estonia